Fado Tradicional is the fifth studio album by Portuguese fado singer Mariza, released on 29 November 2010 by EMI Music Portugal. It was recorded in the Lisboa Estúdios in Portugal between July and September 2010 and produced by musician Diogo Clemente.

Critical reception

Fado Tradicional received positive reviews from music critics, both in Portugal and internationally.

Commercial performance
Fado Tradicional was a certified platinum record in Portugal on the day of its release, for the sale of more than 20,000 copies.

Track listing

Personnel
The following people are credited on the album:

Instruments

Ângelo Freire – portuguese guitar
Diogo Clemente – fado viola
José Marino de Freitas – bass viola

References

2010 albums
Mariza albums